The 1900 Portsmouth by-election was a parliamentary by-election held on 3 May 1900 for one of the two seats in the British House of Commons constituency of Portsmouth in Hampshire.

Vacancy
The seat had become vacant when the Liberal Member of Parliament (MP) Walter Clough had resigned his seat on 23 April 1900 by the technical device of accepting appointment as Steward of the Manor of Northstead, a notional "office of profit under The Crown". The writ for the by-election was moved in the Commons three days later, on 26 April.

Previous result

Candidates 
The Liberal Party selected Thomas Bramsdon, a 43-year-old solicitor and a native of Portsmouth.  The Conservative Party selected 29-year-old James Majendie.

Results 
The result was a narrow victory for Bramsdon.  

However, he held the seat only briefly; at the general election in October 1900, he lost his seat to Majendie.

See also 
 Portsmouth constituency
 1916 Portsmouth by-election
 Portsmouth
 List of United Kingdom by-elections
 United Kingdom by-election records

References 

Bibliography

External links 
 

1900 in England
Elections in Portsmouth
1900 elections in the United Kingdom
By-elections to the Parliament of the United Kingdom in Hampshire constituencies
19th century in Hampshire
May 1900 events